Clear Creek School District RE-1 is the school district serving students of Clear Creek County, Colorado.  The district's mission statement is "We will educate and inspire all learners in a safe and challenging academic environment to go forth and share the best they have to offer to the world".

Board of education
President: Sandi Schuessler
Vice President: Kelly Flenniken
Secretary: Larry Pyers
Member: Erica Haag
Member: Jessica North

List of schools

Elementary
Carlson Elementary School
King-Murphy Elementary School

Middle
Clear Creek Middle School

High
Clear Creek High School

Charter
Georgetown Community School

See also
List of school districts in Colorado

References

External links

School districts in Colorado
Clear Creek County Public Schools (Colorado)